Bağcağız is a village in Mut district of Mersin Province, Turkey. The population of Bağcağız was 188 as of 2012. It is an old village: according to Ensar Köse, the earliest document about the village was an Ottoman document of the 16th century which gave the 16th century population of the village as 82. Its main economic activity is farming, producing fruits like apricots and plums. Recently the village was in the news, because of villagers' objection to a planned quarry around the village.

References

Villages in Mut District